A2X Markets is a South African stock exchange. It was founded by Sean Melnick, Ashley Mendelowitz and Kevin Brady, individuals with experience in financial markets and technology. Their goal was to create a new South African exchange to bring healthy competition to the South African marketplace.

A2X is an MTF styled stock exchange that was awarded a licence to operate an exchange by the Financial Services Board, now Financial Sector Conduct Authority (FSCA) on 6 April 2017. On 6 October 2017, A2X debuted with 3 listings African Rainbow Capital, Peregrine Holdings and Coronation Fund Managers and a combined market cap of R14 billion.

Listed securities

References

Stock exchanges in South Africa
Companies based in Sandton